Nanotek, born Mark Christiansen, is an international drum and bass and dubstep producer and DJ from Wellington, New Zealand. Nanotek gained international recognition in 2007 with releases on darkstep labels such as Freak Recordings and Obscene Recordings. More recent projects include collaborations with artists such as Counterstrike, Current Value and Gein as well as Christiansen's first release on his self-titled label, Nanotek.

Biography
Nanotek has been involved with music since his teenage years when he played guitar and drums in metal bands. In the mid 90s he discovered industrial and electronic music. Moving to Wellington in 2003, Christiansen was introduced to the sounds of Dom & Roland, Photek, and Dylan, which became key influences in his darkstep and hard sound.
 
During this period, saw him presenting a regular prime time show on electronic music station Firm FM. An invitation from Wellington's Noise Enthusiast crew to headline their night 'Descend' was the first step that took Christiansen on to supporting DJs such as Tech Itch and Limewax.
 
His break came in late 2006 when Dylan, owner of Freak Recordings, signed two of his tracks, Acid Burn and Deadly Force, to his sister label Obscene Recordings.
This was a turning point for Christiansen, who gained international recognition from DJs such as Current Value, SPL, Limewax, B-Key, Tech Itch, Gein, and Counterstrike, as a result.

Discography

Releases
 2006: Nightwatch on Intransigent Digital
 2007: Acid Burn / Deadly Force
 2007: Fresh Hell on Freak Recordings
 2007: The Vengeful on Intransigent Recordings
 2007: Those Who Dwell Within on Intransigent Recordings
 2009: Never Say Die / Angels of Truth
 2009: Behemoth / Better Place on Tech Itch Records
 2010: The Master with Gein on Guerilla Recordings
 2010: Blackness with Counterstrike on Counterstrike Recordings
 2011: Code of Chaos on Prspct Recordings
 2011: Resurrection EP on Nanotek
 2011: The Freak Obscene Days EP on Nanotek

References

External links

 Official Website
 Nanotek on Facebook
 

Club DJs
Dance musicians
Drum and bass musicians
Dubstep musicians
Electronica musicians
New Zealand DJs
Electronic dance music DJs